3/24 is a Spanish Catalan-language free-to-air news and information network operated by Televisió de Catalunya (TVC).

It was launched on 11 September 2003.

History

3/24 was born on 11 September 2003 as an initiative of the Catalan public television to develop digital terrestrial television in Catalonia. However, a general lack of DVB-T set top boxes combined with slight public interest towards digital terrestrial television prompted TVC to simulcast in analogue.

From its launch on 11 September 2003 until 12 June 2004, 3/24 was on air daily from 11p.m. till 8:30a.m.. The channel now operates as a regular full-time channel.

Contents
3/24 devotes exclusively to live news and information, including news, traffic (morning), sports and stock markets from Bolsa de Barcelona. Originally, 3/24 was to become the first 24-hour news service in Catalonia. Later, this plan was dropped, and it was remade into a continuous information service. In consequence, this channel now also features special blocks dedicated to science, society, history, etc.

Most of the day, under the title Notícies 3/24, the channel features a 30-minute informational wheel, including 2 minutes of headlines, 18 minutes of news, 8 minutes of sports and 2 minutes of regional weather. Along with other Televisió de Catalunya's channels, no live programming is featured between 01:00 and 07:00 unless news breaks.

3/24 also shares programs with sister channel TV3. It simulcasts TV3's daily news programs, Telenotícies every day at 14:30-16:00 and 21-22:00; and its morning news program Els Matins every weekday 08:00-10:15. Also, in the early morning, TV3 also simulcasts 3/24 from 07:00 to 08:00 on weekdays, 08:15 on Saturday and 10:15 on Sunday. During the summer break and public holidays, TV3 simulcasts 3/24 in its entirety, in place of Els Matins, but it ends at 10:00. Plus, the nightly world news programme Món 3/24, running from 22 to 23:30, was then rebroadcast on TV3 twice at 23:30 and 00:00 every Tuesday and Wednesday.

3/24 also broadcasts sports-related programmes such as "3/24 Esports" and its sister channel Esport 3 also simulcast this programme. This show can be watched nightly at 12:05am.

Programming

News
 Noticies 3/24
 Telenotícies
 3/24 Esports

Information
 L'entrevista del Diumenge
 Més 3/24
 3/24 en Áranes
 Món 3/24
 3/24 Comarques

See also
 Televisió de Catalunya

External links
Official Site 
Televisió de Catalunya

24-hour television news channels in Spain
Catalan-language television stations
Televisió de Catalunya
Television channels and stations established in 2003
Television stations in Catalonia